The 1978–79 season of the European Cup football club tournament was won by English champions Nottingham Forest in the final against Swedish side Malmö FF. Forest, enjoying a great run of success under Brian Clough, had defeated defending two-time champions Liverpool in the first round.

Preliminary round

|}

First leg

Second leg

Monaco won 3–2 on aggregate.

Bracket

First round

|}

First leg

Second leg

AEK Athens won 7–5 on aggregate.

Nottingham Forest won 2–0 on aggregate.

Real Madrid won 12–0 on aggregate.

Grasshopper won 13–3 on aggregate.

Lokomotiv Sofia won 4–3 on aggregate.

Köln won 5–2 on aggregate.

Rangers won 2–1 on aggregate.

PSV Eindhoven won 7–3 on aggregate.

Austria Wien won 4–3 on aggregate.

Lillestrøm won 1–0 on aggregate.

2–2 on aggregate; Bohemians won on away goals.

2–2 on aggregate; Dynamo Dresden won on penalties.

Zbrojovka Brno won 4–2 on aggregate.

Wisła Kraków won 4–3 on aggregate.

Dynamo Kyiv won 4–1 on aggregate.

Malmö FF won 1–0 on aggregate.

Second round

|}

First leg

Second leg

Nottingham Forest won 7–2 on aggregate.

3–3 on aggregate; Grasshopper won on away goals.

Köln won 5–0 on aggregate.

Rangers won 3–2 on aggregate.

Austria Wien won 4–1 on aggregate.

Dynamo Dresden won 6–0 on aggregate.

3–3 on aggregate; Wisła Kraków won on away goals.

Malmö FF won 2–0 on aggregate.

Quarter-finals

|}

First leg

Second leg

Nottingham Forest won 5–2 on aggregate.

Köln won 2–1 on aggregate.

Austria Wien won 3–2 on aggregate.

Malmö FF won 5–3 on aggregate.

Semi-finals

|}

First leg

Second leg

Nottingham Forest won 4–3 on aggregate.

Malmö FF won 1–0 on aggregate.

Final

Top scorers
The top scorers from the 1978–79 European Cup (excluding preliminary round) are as follows:

Notes

References

External links
1978–79 All matches – season at UEFA website
 European Cup results at Rec.Sport.Soccer Statistics Foundation
 All scorers 1978–79 European Cup (excluding preliminary round) according to protocols UEFA
1978/79 European Cup – results and line-ups (archive)

1978–79 in European football
European Champion Clubs' Cup seasons